Robert "Scratcher" Neal (born 16 December 1956) is a former Australian rules footballer in the Victorian Football League.

Playing with the Geelong Football Club, he wore the number 35 during his tenure at the club. Scratcher crossed to StKilda where he played 20 matches in number 36 in 1987 before changing to his familiar 35.

References

External links
 

1956 births
Living people
St Kilda Football Club players
Geelong Football Club players
Wynyard Football Club players
Tasmanian State of Origin players
Australian rules footballers from Tasmania
Tasmanian Football Hall of Fame inductees